Aeschynanthus is a genus of about 150 species of evergreen subtropical and tropical plants in the family Gesneriaceae. They are usually trailing epiphytes with brightly colored flowers that are pollinated by sunbirds. The genus name comes from a contraction of aischuno (to be ashamed) and anthos (flower). The common name for some species is lipstick plant, which comes from the appearance of the developing buds emerging from the calyces. A full list of the accepted species and their synonyms can be found in the Smithsonian Institution's World Checklist of Gesneriaceae.

The genus contains a large variety of plants with differing features. Some have thick, waxy cuticles while others have much softer leaves. Species such as A. speciosus are large where A. micranthus is much smaller and trailing. Several species are valued in temperate climates as houseplants, notably A. longicaulis, A. pulcher and A. radicans.

Species 
Species include:

 Aeschynanthus acuminatissimus W.T.Wang
 Aeschynanthus acuminatus Wall. ex A.DC.
 Aeschynanthus albidus (Blume) Steud.
 Aeschynanthus amoenus C.B.Clarke
 Aeschynanthus andersonii C.B.Clarke
 Aeschynanthus angustioblongus W.T.Wang
 Aeschynanthus apicidens Hance
 Aeschynanthus arctocalyx Mendum & Madulid
 Aeschynanthus arfakensis C.B.Clarke
 Aeschynanthus argentii Mendum
 Aeschynanthus asclepioides (Elmer) B.L.Burtt & P.Woods
 Aeschynanthus atrorubens Schltr.
 Aeschynanthus atrosanguineus Van Houtte ex C.B.Clarke
 Aeschynanthus batakiorum Mendum & Madulid
 Aeschynanthus batesii Mendum
 Aeschynanthus brachyphyllus S.Moore
 Aeschynanthus bracteatus Wall. ex A.DC.
 Aeschynanthus brevicalyx Miq.
 Aeschynanthus burttii Mendum
 Aeschynanthus buxifolius Hemsl.
 Aeschynanthus calanthus Schltr.
 Aeschynanthus cambodiensis D.J.Middleton
 Aeschynanthus camiguinensis Kraenzl.
 Aeschynanthus candidus Hend. ex C.B.Clarke
 Aeschynanthus cardinalis (Copel. ex Merr.) Schltr.
 Aeschynanthus caudatus C.B.Clarke
 Aeschynanthus celebicus Koord.
 Aeschynanthus ceylanicus Gardner
 Aeschynanthus chiritoides C.B.Clarke
 Aeschynanthus chorisepalus Orr
 Aeschynanthus chrysanthus P.Woods
 Aeschynanthus citrinus Mendum & S.M.Scott
 Aeschynanthus cordifolius Hook.
 Aeschynanthus crassifolius (Elmer) Schltr.
 Aeschynanthus cryptanthus C.B.Clarke
 Aeschynanthus curtisii C.B.Clarke
 Aeschynanthus curvicalyx Mendum
 Aeschynanthus dasycalyx Hallier f.
 Aeschynanthus dempoensis S.Moore
 Aeschynanthus dischorensis Schltr.
 Aeschynanthus dolichanthus W.T. Wang
 Aeschynanthus dunnii H.Lév.
 Aeschynanthus ellipticus K.Schum. & Lauterb.
 Aeschynanthus elmeri Mendum
 Aeschynanthus elongatus C.B.Clarke
 Aeschynanthus everettianus Kraenzl.
 Aeschynanthus fecundus P.Woods
 Aeschynanthus firmus Kraenzl.
 Aeschynanthus flammeus Schltr.
 Aeschynanthus flavidus Mendum & P.Woods
 Aeschynanthus flippancei Ridl.
 Aeschynanthus forbesii K.Schum.
 Aeschynanthus foxworthyi Kraenzl.
 Aeschynanthus fraserianus Kraenzl.
 Aeschynanthus fruticosus Ridl.
 Aeschynanthus fulgens Wall. ex R.Br.
 Aeschynanthus garrettii Craib
 Aeschynanthus geminatus Zoll. & Moritzi
 Aeschynanthus gesneriflorus S.Moore
 Aeschynanthus gjellerupii Schltr.
 Aeschynanthus glomeriflorus Kraenzl.
 Aeschynanthus griffithii R.Br.
 Aeschynanthus guttatus P.Woods
 Aeschynanthus hartleyi P.Woods
 Aeschynanthus hians C.B.Clarke
 Aeschynanthus hispidus Schltr.
 Aeschynanthus hookeri C.B.Clarke
 Aeschynanthus horsfieldii R.Br.
 Aeschynanthus hoseanus Kraenzl.
 Aeschynanthus hosseusii Pellegr.
 Aeschynanthus humilis Hemsl.
 Aeschynanthus impar Schltr.
 Aeschynanthus intermedia Teijsm. & Binn.
 Aeschynanthus intraflavus Mendum
 Aeschynanthus janowskyi Schltr.
 Aeschynanthus jouyi D.J.Middleton
 Aeschynanthus kermesinus Schltr.
 Aeschynanthus kingii C.B.Clarke
 Aeschynanthus lancilimbus W.T.Wang
 Aeschynanthus lasianthus W.T.Wang
 Aeschynanthus lasiocalyx W.T.Wang
 Aeschynanthus lepidospermus C.B.Clarke
 Aeschynanthus leptocladus C.B.Clarke
 Aeschynanthus leucothamnos Kraenzl.
 Aeschynanthus levipes C.B.Clarke
 Aeschynanthus ligustrinus Schltr.
 Aeschynanthus linearifolius C.E.C.Fisch.
 Aeschynanthus lineatus Craib
 Aeschynanthus lobaticalyx Mendum
 Aeschynanthus loheri Kraenzl.
 Aeschynanthus longicalyx Ridl.
 Aeschynanthus longicaulis Wall. ex R.Br.
 Aeschynanthus longiflorus (Blume) A.DC.
 Aeschynanthus macrocalyx C.B.Clarke
 Aeschynanthus madulidii Mendum
 Aeschynanthus magnificus Stapf
 Aeschynanthus mannii Kurz ex C.B.Clarke
 Aeschynanthus marginatus Ridl.
 Aeschynanthus masoniae Kurz ex C.B.Clarke
 Aeschynanthus medogensis W.T.Wang
 Aeschynanthus membranifolius (Costantin) D.J.Middleton
 Aeschynanthus mendumiae D.J.Middleton
 Aeschynanthus mengxingensis W.T.Wang
 Aeschynanthus meo K.Schum.
 Aeschynanthus micranthus C.B.Clarke
 Aeschynanthus microcardius B.L.Burtt & R.A.Davidson
 Aeschynanthus microphyllus C.B.Clarke
 Aeschynanthus microtrichus C.B.Clarke
 Aeschynanthus miniaceus B.L.Burtt & P.Woods
 Aeschynanthus miniatus Lindl.
 Aeschynanthus minutifolius D.J.Middleton
 Aeschynanthus mollis Schltr.
 Aeschynanthus monetarius Dunn
 Aeschynanthus moningerae (Merr.) Chun
 Aeschynanthus montisucris P.Royen
 Aeschynanthus motleyi C.B.Clarke
 Aeschynanthus musaensis P.Woods
 Aeschynanthus myrmecophilus P.Woods
 Aeschynanthus myrtifolius Schltr.
 Aeschynanthus nabirensis Kaneh. & Hatus.
 Aeschynanthus nervosus (Elmer) Schltr.
 Aeschynanthus novogracilis W.T.Wang
 Aeschynanthus nummularius (Burkill & S.Moore) K.Schum.
 Aeschynanthus obconicus C.B.Clarke
 Aeschynanthus obovatus C.B.Clarke
 Aeschynanthus oxychlamys Mendum
 Aeschynanthus pachyanthus Schltr.
 Aeschynanthus papuanus (Schltr.) B.L.Burtt
 Aeschynanthus parasiticus (Roxb.) Wall.
 Aeschynanthus parviflorus (D.Don) Spreng.
 Aeschynanthus pedunculatus D.J.Middleton
 Aeschynanthus perakensis Ridl.
 Aeschynanthus pergracilis Kraenzl.
 Aeschynanthus perrottetii A.DC.
 Aeschynanthus phaeotrichus Schltr.
 Aeschynanthus philippinensis C.B.Clarke
 Aeschynanthus planiculmis (C.B.Clarke) Gamble
 Aeschynanthus planipetiolatus H.W.Li
 Aeschynanthus podocarpus C.B.Clarke
 Aeschynanthus poilanei Pellegr.
 Aeschynanthus polillensis Kraenzl.
 Aeschynanthus praelongus Kraenzl.
 Aeschynanthus pseudohybridus Mendum
 Aeschynanthus pulcher (Blume) G.Don
 Aeschynanthus pullei Schltr.
 Aeschynanthus radicans Jack
 Aeschynanthus rarus Schltr.
 Aeschynanthus rhododendron Ridl.
 Aeschynanthus rhodophyllus Kraenzl.
 Aeschynanthus roseoflorus Mendum
 Aeschynanthus roseus Schltr.
 Aeschynanthus rubiginosus Teijsm. & Binn.
 Aeschynanthus sanguineus Schltr.
 Aeschynanthus serpens Kraenzl.
 Aeschynanthus setosus Kraenzl.
 Aeschynanthus sinolongicalyx W.T.Wang
 Aeschynanthus siphonanthus C.B.Clarke
 Aeschynanthus sojolianus Mendum & L.E.R.Galloway
 Aeschynanthus solomonensis P.Woods
 Aeschynanthus speciosus Hook.
 Aeschynanthus stenocalyx Kraenzl.
 Aeschynanthus stenosepalus J.Anthony
 Aeschynanthus stenosiphon Schltr.
 Aeschynanthus suborbiculatus S.Moore
 Aeschynanthus superbus C.B.Clarke
 Aeschynanthus tenericaulis Diels
 Aeschynanthus tengchungensis W.T.Wang
 Aeschynanthus tenuis Hand.-Mazz.
 Aeschynanthus tetraquetrus C.B.Clarke
 Aeschynanthus teysmannianus Miq.
 Aeschynanthus tirapensis Bhattacharyya
 Aeschynanthus torricellensis Schltr.
 Aeschynanthus trichocalyx Kraenzl.
 Aeschynanthus tricolor Hook.
 Aeschynanthus tubiflorus C.B.Clarke
 Aeschynanthus tubulosus J.Anthony
 Aeschynanthus verticillatus C.B.Clarke
 Aeschynanthus vinaceus P.Woods
 Aeschynanthus viridiflorus Teijsm. & Binn.
 Aeschynanthus volubilis Jack
 Aeschynanthus wallichii Benn.
 Aeschynanthus wardii Merr.
 Aeschynanthus warianus Schltr.
 Aeschynanthus zamboangensis Kraenzl.

Cultivation 
They require good lighting and semi-moist, well-drained soil conditions to grow, though they vary and some require more moist soil. They also prefer warm and humid conditions.

References

External links 
 Aeschynanthus from The Gesneriad Reference Web
 Navigate to Aeschynanthus from The Genera of Gesneriaceae
 World Checklist of Gesneriaceae

 
Gesneriaceae genera
Epiphytes
Lamiales of Asia